Edward H. Larkin (1877 – 1944) was a Massachusetts politician who served as the tenth mayor of Medford, Massachusetts.

Notes

Mayors of Medford, Massachusetts
Massachusetts city council members
1877 births
1944 deaths